Tribal Army may refer to:
 Galway United F.C., which is nicknamed the "Tribal Army"
 Forces of the Fighters of the Tribes, which are also known as the "Tribal Army"